The 1995-96 Turkish First Football League season saw 18 teams in competition. Fenerbahçe S.K. won the championship. The season was notable for Graeme Souness's season-long cameo as the manager of Galatasaray.

League table

Results

Top scorers

References

Turkey - List of final tables (RSSSF)

Süper Lig seasons
1995–96 in Turkish football
Turkey